The 2016 Quaker State 400 presented by Advance Auto Parts was a NASCAR Sprint Cup Series stock car race held on July 9, 2016 at Kentucky Speedway in Sparta, Kentucky. Contested over 267 laps on the  speedway, it was the 18th race of the 2016 NASCAR Sprint Cup Series.

The race had 16 lead changes among 9 different drivers and eleven cautions for 53 laps.

Report

Background

The sixth running of the Quaker State 400 was held in Sparta, Kentucky at Kentucky Speedway on July 9, 2016. The track is a  tri-oval speedway owned by Speedway Motorsports, Inc. Kentucky Speedway, which has also hosted the ARCA Racing Series, NASCAR Camping World Truck Series, NASCAR Xfinity Series, and the Indy Racing League, has a grandstand seating capacity of 107,000.

Aero package
During Coca-Cola 600 race weekend, NASCAR announced they would test changes to the aero package at Michigan and Kentucky.

NASCAR Executive Vice-President and Chief Racing Development Officer Steve O'Donnell said that NASCAR looks "at it as a never-ending journey; if we can improve we're going to do that. We wanted to go the direction of low downforce, see how that worked, not kind of go all the way in and hope that we are directionally right. And we are seeing that play out. We've seen some great racing at the beginning of the year. But we also knew that we had some more levers that we could pull if the direction kind of proved out, so we've tried some of those things. We've tested it and what we've also wanted to do is lower some of the corner speeds to allow for even more passing. That was one of the areas where we've seen minimal change, but there are some levers we can pull to really drive that down."

Track changes

Entry list
The preliminary entry list for the race included forty cars and was released on July 1, 2016 at 3:17 pm ET.

Practice

First practice

Second practice
Jimmie Johnson went to his backup car after slamming the wall exiting turn 4 early in the session.

Qualifying
Kevin Harvick was awarded the pole position after qualifying was rained out.

Starting lineup

Practice (post qualifying)

Third practice

Final practice
Kurt Busch dropped to the rear of the field after switching to his backup car because of a wreck in the closing minutes of final practice.

Race

First half

Start
Under clear evening Kentucky skies, Kevin Harvick led the field to the green flag at 7:50. After making contact with the wall in turn 4 the prior lap, Ricky Stenhouse Jr. cut a tire, slammed the wall and brought out the first caution of the race on lap 11. He went on to finish 40th.

The race restarted on lap 15. A scheduled competition caution brought out the second caution of the race on lap 26. Kurt Busch opted not to pit and assumed the lead.

The race restarted on lap 32. The third caution of the race flew the same lap for a single-car wreck on the frontstretch. Exiting turn 4, Jimmie Johnson made contact with Ryan Blaney and sent himself spinning into the wall.

The race restarted on lap 37. Harvick passed his teammate exiting turn 2 to retake the lead on lap 38. The fourth caution of the race flew on lap 54 after Joey Logano suffered a right-front tire blowout and slammed the wall in turn 3. He said afterwards that he "got loose off of four and knocked the right-rear quarter off it and then got real loose. When you get loose you have to slow down more and you use a lot of brake to slow down. Usually, the next thing to go is the right-front tire and that happened. Unfortunately, I put us in a bad spot here. It's not where we want to be and we'll figure out next week." Brad Keselowski opted not to pit and assumed the lead.

Second quarter

The race restarted on lap 60. Martin Truex Jr. out-raced Keselowski to the line to take the lead on lap 63. The fifth caution of the race flew on lap 80 for Matt DiBenedetto after his car slammed the wall in turn 3. David Ragan opted not to pit and assumed the lead. He eventually pitted and handed the lead back to Harvick.

The race restarted on lap 88 and a two-car wreck in turn 3 involving Blaney and Chase Elliott brought out the sixth caution of the race. Blaney said that the "restart was pretty hectic from the beginning with the 78 getting loose and it kind of put everybody in a bad spot, and it wound up with us being in the middle of three-wide into three.  It's so hard to get into that corner all night with a car close to behind you and outside of you, and no one lifting either, and it's just an unfortunate spot we got put in and I hate to see two really good cars tore up.  We were both very fast tonight (24 and 21) and it's just a really unfortunate deal, but we'll try to get it fixed and get back out there and make some laps."

The race restarted on lap 92. A multi-car wreck on the backstretch brought out the seventh caution of the race on lap 94. Exiting turn 2, Brian Scott got loose, saved the car, got turned by Kyle Larson and got t-boned by Chris Buescher. A. J. Allmendinger, Buescher, Ty Dillon, Larson, Danica Patrick, Regan Smith, Scott and Cole Whitt were all collected in the melee.

The race restarted on lap 103. A number of cars began hitting pit road on lap 142. Harvick hit pit road on lap 147 and handed the lead to Austin Dillon. He pitted the next lap and handed the lead to Matt Kenseth. He pitted the next lap and handed the lead to Danica Patrick. She pitted the next lap and the lead cycled to Truex just as the eighth caution of the race flew for Regan Smith who suffered a right-front tire blowout and slammed the wall in turn 3.

Second half

Halfway
The race restarted with 110 laps to go. The ninth caution of the race flew with 108 laps to go for a single-car spin in turn 3 involving Clint Bowyer.

The race restarted with 102 laps to go. The 10th caution of the race flew with 96 laps to go for a single-car wreck on the frontstretch involving A. J. Allmendinger.

The race restarted with 91 laps to go. Harvick passed Truex in turn 3 to retake the lead with 90 laps to go. The 11th caution of the race flew with 74 laps to go after Landon Cassill slammed the wall in turn 2. Truex was forced to serve a pass-through penalty for passing Harvick on entry to pit road. He said after the race that he "did the same thing guys do every week. You get to your timing line, you step on the gas and you head straight towards your pit. So obviously I turned left and came up next to [Harvick] as I did it, as I was driving to my pit which guys do every week. I don't know why it was different today. I would think that if they didn't want us to do that any more they'd tell us in the driver meeting. But hell, it's every week. I've been passed on pit road 15 times this year the same exact way. I didn't see it get penalized. I guess when you're doing it for a win it's different circumstances or something." "Everybody does it," a visibly disappointed Truex added on pit road. "I've had people pass me the same way at Bristol and Martinsville. They'll drive right by you through the pit. Everybody does it, so I don't know why all of a sudden they're making an example out of me. It's frustrating when you don't win. I feel like I've had a lot not go the right way the last couple years, especially. It is what it is. We'll move on."

Fourth quarter
The race restarted with 68 laps to go. Keselowski took the lead with 67 laps to go. In the final 10 laps, a number of cars began pitting so to have enough fuel to make the finish. Kenseth briefly took the lead from Keselowski before he pitted with four laps to go and handed the lead back to Keselowski. Keselowski decreased his speed dramatically to conserve fuel. This allowed Carl Edwards to pull to within a car-length with one lap remaining. He blocked Edwards's advance as he re-fired his engine and drove on to score the victory.

Post-race

Driver comments
Keselowski said in victory lane that he felt "terrible that I couldn't do a burnout for the fans. I didn't have enough gas," Keselowski said after going the final 71 laps on fuel. Yeah, this is our best stretch and I'm really, really proud of that. We've got to keep it going through the fall, that's really important, but this is great. I'm just so proud of my guys. I feel terrible for the fans because I didn't get to do a burnout. I didn't have any gas. The car wouldn't run, but we're back here in Victory Lane and what a great Saturday night."

After a runner-up finish, Edwards said he "thought I had him, too. He played it perfectly and he did it – he won at the absolute slowest possible speed he could. I thought he was out of fuel and that was that. I just appreciate the crowd coming out here, it's always neat to come to Kentucky. It's the site of my first win 13 years ago and it's a special place…That's a tough one to be that close. We were getting such good fuel mileage with our TRD (Toyota Racing Development) engine, I think we might have had a little extra there. That's going to be the hard part, going to bed knowing you could have gone a little faster." He added that he thought Keselowski "was out of fuel, and he wasn't. He played it perfectly. He let me get to him and then stood on it. We had a shot at it, we just weren't able to do it. Saved a little too much."

Race results

Race summary
 Lead changes: 16 among 9 drivers
 Cautions: 11 for 53 laps
 Red flags: none
 Time of race: 3 hours, 6 minutes and 55 seconds
 Average speed:

Media

Television
NBC Sports covered the race on the television side. Rick Allen, Jeff Burton and Steve Letarte had the call in the booth for the race. Dave Burns, Mike Massaro, Marty Snider and Kelli Stavast reported from pit lane during the race.

Radio
PRN had the radio call for the race, which was simulcast on Sirius XM NASCAR Radio.

Standings after the race

Note: Only the first 16 positions are included for the driver standings.. – Driver has clinched a position in the Chase for the Sprint Cup.

References

2016 NASCAR Sprint Cup Series
2016 in sports in Kentucky
2016 Quaker State 400
July 2016 sports events in the United States